Frank Brown (August 8, 1846 – February 3, 1920), a member of the United States Democratic Party, was the 42nd Governor of Maryland in the United States from 1892 to 1896. Born in 1846 in Sykesville, Maryland, he also served as a member of the Maryland House of Delegates from 1876 to 1878. He died in 1920 in Baltimore, Maryland.

Brown was employed early on by the R. Sinclair & Co. Later he worked as a clerk in the State tobacco warehouse from 1870 to 1875. In 1880, he became the President of the Maryland State Agricultural & Mechanical Society. From 1886 to 1890 Brown was assigned to be the Postmaster of Baltimore.  For the World's Columbian Exposition of 1893 Brown was the President of Board of Managers in Maryland. Later in life he served as the President of the Baltimore Traction Company.

His political positions included becoming Campaign Treasurer of the Democratic State Central Committee in 1885 In 1892, Brown was elected to his highest position as Governor of Maryland, serving four years.  Brown later was Campaign manager for Thomas G. Hayes and J. Barry Mahool's run for mayor of Baltimore in 1899 and 1906. His last position was the City Collector for Baltimore.

Brown is buried at the Greenmount Cemetery in Baltimore, Maryland.

References

1846 births
1920 deaths
People from Sykesville, Maryland
American Presbyterians
Democratic Party governors of Maryland
Democratic Party members of the Maryland House of Delegates